Abernethy is a small town in the City of Cessnock, in the Hunter Region in the state of New South Wales, Australia. Abernethy is located 8 kilometres south-east of the town of Cessnock, NSW and is adjacent to Werakata National Park and the Aberdare State Forest. The town was founded near a coal mine and some of the historic buildings remain (including the Abernethy Hotel which now operates as a guest house). In 2016 348 lived there  with the median age being 32  and 74.8% being born in Australia.

Mining history
The town's origins lie in the establishment of the Aberdare South Colliery which was operated by Caledonian Collieries Limited.  The town was laid out in 1906 and the mine commenced operation in 1913.  The mine closed in 1927.

Some structures of the old Colliery are still present on the site including the winder house, the chimney stack and dam.

Population 
In 2016 the population is 348 and the median age is 32. 74.8% were born in Australia and 2.1% were born in England. 26.0% were Anglican, 22.5% mot stated, 20.8% no religion, 13.9% Catholic and 7.2% Presbyterian and Reformed. 79.65 only spoke English at home.

Bushfire in 2002
On 19 October 2002, a large bushfire in Abernethy claimed the life of Sydney businessman Ronald Gillett, destroyed six homes and damaged many more.

A 2004 inquest found that the fire was deliberately lit "by persons unknown". A subsequent inquest reached a similar conclusion in 2008.  In February 2010, Police announced a $100,000 reward for information that leads to the arrest of the arsonist.

See also
 South Maitland coalfields

References

 "They called it Siberia : the story of the South Maitland 'coal rush', Aberdare South Colliery and Abernethy village"  by Neville Robinson  (NLA Catalogue Ref)

External links
 "Rural East Precinct" - Cessnock City Council area profile
 Abernethy Guest House
 Photo of old Aberdare South Colliery Buildings

Suburbs of City of Cessnock
Towns in the Hunter Region